Billy George (born 4 April 1991)  is a British gymnast.

Education
George trained IDTA Ballet, Tap, and Modern Jazz at his mother's dance school, Armley Dance Studios, Leeds. Billy attended Intake Arts College in Bramley, Leeds, a specialist performing arts school. In 2009, he attended the National Centre for Circus Arts in London formally known as Circus Space.

Career
George first became well known on Britain's Got Talent (series 6) where he was a semi-finalist. He then went on to be a professional gymnast on BBC series, Tumble, where his celebrity partner was TOWIE's Lucy Mecklenburgh. He was a trainer on Get Your Act Together, training TOWIE's Elliott Wright. In 2015, Billy joined Diversity on their UK Arena tour of 'Up Close and Personal' as a Special Guest.

References

1991 births
Living people
British male artistic gymnasts
Britain's Got Talent contestants
Sportspeople from Batley
21st-century British people